Alphabetical list of Trost & Trost works by location, covering states in America.

Properties listed on the National Register of Historic Places are displayed in bold text.

United States

Arizona

Nogales 
Santa Cruz County Court House, 1904
Phoenix
Luhrs Building, 1924
Luhrs Tower, 1929
Douglas, Arizona
Gadsden Hotel, 1907

Colorado

New Mexico

Albuquerque
Castle Apartments (demolished), 1922 
Occidental Life Building, 1917
Rosenwald Building, 1910
First National Bank Building, 1922
Franciscan Hotel (demolished), 1923
Old Albuquerque High School, Main Building, 1914
Sunshine Building, 1924
Dwyer
NAN Ranch, 1928, Dwyer, New Mexico
Las Cruces Country Club clubhouse, Las Cruces, New Mexico.;
Las Cruces
New Mexico State University campus

Texas

Alpine
The Holland Hotel, 209 W. Holland Ave., 1928, Recorded Texas Historic Landmark (RTHL)
Private residence, 538 N. 6th. St., ca. 1928
Library building at Sul Ross State University (now Morelock Academic Building), 1929-1930
Anthony
Federal Correctional Institution, La Tuna, 1931-1932
Prison staff residences, ca. 1938
Austin
Driskill Hotel, 1930 tower addition, RTHL
Big Spring
Big Spring High School (former), 200 E. 10th St., 1928-1929
Crawford Hotel, W. 3rd St. at Scurry, 1927-1928 (demolished)
Lester Fisher Bldg., 106 W. 3rd St., 1927-1928
Clint
Clint School (now Clint Junior High School), 13100 Alameda Ave., 1936
El Paso
St. Josephs Academy (demolished); 700-704 North El Paso St.
W.W. Turner residence (now the International Museum of Art)
YMCA (demolished in 1961)
First Presbyterian Church (demolished)
Henry C. Trost House (NRHP)
Vilas School;220 Lawton Ave.
El Paso Country Club (destroyed by Fire in 1916); Club Road-west of Ft. Bliss
Richard Caples Building (NRHP)
Dormitory at El Paso Military Institute 1909;
Abdou Building, 1910 (NRHP)
Young Women's Christian Association (demolished);
Roberts-Banner Building (NRHP)
Anson Mills Building (NRHP)
Alta Vista School, 1912;3500 La Luz
Masonic Temple (demolished in 1968);
Hotel Oregon (demolished);
Hotel Paso del Norte, 1912 (NRHP)
Popular Dry Goods Department Store (now Union Fashion Center) (NRHP)
White House Department Store (now The Centre)
The Wigwam Theater remodeling;
Lydia Patterson Institute (demolished in 1963-64); 503 South Florence St.
El Paso High School, 1600 North Virginia St. (NRHP)
Temple San Ignacio de Loyola addition;
Palace Theater-Originally Alhambra Theater (NRHP)
Texas State School of Mines & Metallurgy Assay Office (demolished);
Hotel Worth - Hotel Adalante, Raler Hotel, Baker Hotel amongst other names;
El Paso Country Court House (demolished in 1988);
Alterations to the Texas Grand Theater Building (demolished 1952);
Independent Order of Odd Fellows Lodge#284 (demolished);
University of Texas at El Paso- Old Main Building, 1917 (RTHL)
University of Texas at El Paso- Quinn Hall, 1917;
University of Texas at El Paso- Graham Hall, 1917;
University of Texas at El Paso- Geology Building,
University of Texas at El Paso- Kelly Hall;
Houston High School, 1922;2851 Grant Ave.
Morehead School (demolished);Arizona between Campbell and Kansas
State National Bank Building (NRHP)
Loretto Academy;4600 Hueco Ave. @ 1300 Hardaway St.
El Paso Community College; 103 West Rio Grande
Hotel Dieu School of Nursing (demolished);1103 North Kansas
Congregation B' Naizion (destroyed by arson October 13, 1984);
Gateway Hotel remodeling;
Mieland Hotel;
St. Josephs Sanatorium (demolished in Oct. 1972);700-704 North El Paso St.
Zach White School, 1929;4864 Doniphan
Fire Station #11, 1930
Fire Station #10, 1930
Plaza Hotel (El Paso, Texas) - Plaza Motor Hotel, New Sheldon Hotel, Hilton Hotel amongst other names (NRHP)
O. T. Bassett Tower (NRHP)
Coldwell School;4101 Altura Ave.
Jones School (demolished);
Hotel Cortez (NRHP)
University of Texas at El Paso- Warrell Hall;
University of Texas at El Paso- Benedict;
El Paso Country Club repairs (proposed 1920-1922);400 Camino Real
University of Texas at El Paso- Holliday Hall;
Cooley School Addition; 134 North Awbrey
Liberty Hall Theater (demolished in 1987);
El Paso County Hospital remodeling and additions & replacement building,(demolished 1929);
Mitchell Industrial Complex;south florence and Jennie Mitchell
J. J. Newberry Company (NRHP)
Singer Sewing Company (NRHP, RTHL)
White House Department Store and Hotel McCoy (NRHP)
Fabens
Fabens High School (former, now O'Donnell Intermediate School), 300 NE Camp St., 1925
First Baptist Church, 318 Fabens St., 1928
First National Bank Bldg., SW corner Main and Fabens sts., 1925 (demolished in 2016)
Fort Hancock
Fort Hancock High School, 100 E. School Dr., 1925
Marathon
The Gage Hotel, 102 NW 1st St., 1927, RTHL
Marfa
Allen Marshall McCabe House, 309 E. Salarosa St., 1925
Frank Courtney Mellard Residence, 401 N. Summer Ave., 1915
El Paisano Hotel, 207 N. Highland Ave., 1930, RTHL
Pecos
Pecos Hospital (former), 601 S. Hickory St., 1929
Pecos Hospital addition, 1937
Reeves County Courthouse, 100 E. 4th St., 1937
Sanderson
Kerr Mercantile Building, 1927

See also
List of Trost & Trost works

References

External links

02
Trosts
Trosts